March 10 - Eastern Orthodox liturgical calendar - March 12

All fixed commemorations below are observed on March 24 by Orthodox Churches on the Old Calendar.

For March 11th, Orthodox Churches on the Old Calendar commemorate the Saints listed on February 26 (February 27 on leap years).

Saints

 Hieromartyr Pionius, Priest of Smyrna, and those with him (250):
 Asclepiades, Macedonia, Linus (Limnus), and Sabina.
 Hieromartyrs Trophimus and Thalus, Priests, of Laodicea (300)  (see also: March 16)
 The Holy Syrian Martyrs (4th century)
 Venerable George, Abbot of Sinai (c. 545), brother of St. John Climacus.
 Venerable John Moschos, the ascetic writer of ‘The Spiritual Meadow’ (622)
 Venerable Sophronius of Jerusalem, Patriarch of Jerusalem (638)
 Saint George the New, Wonderworker of Constantinople (c. 970)

Pre-Schism Western saints

 Martyrs Candidus, Piperion and Companions, 22 martyrs who suffered in North Africa (in Carthage or in Alexandria), under Valerian and Gallienus (c. 254-259)
 Martyrs Heraclius and Zosimus, who suffered in Carthage in North Africa under Valerian and Gallienus (263)
 Martyr Alberta, one of the first victims of the persecution under Diocletian, she suffered in Agen in France with St Faith and others (c. 286)
 Martyr Constantine, a confessor in Carthage in North Africa.
 Hieromartyr Constantine of Cornwall and Govan, in Kintyre, Scotland (576) (see also: March 9)
 Saint Constantine of Strathclyde, King, Monk, Confessor (640)
 Saint Vigilius, Successor of St Palladius (661) as Bishop of Auxerre in France, murdered in a forest near Compiègne by order of the mayor of the palace (685)
 Saint Vindician, a  disciple of St Eligius, became Bishop of Arras-Cambrai in France and bravely protested against the excesses of the Merovingian Kings (712)
 Saint Benedict Crispus of Milan, Archbishop of Milan in Italy for forty-five years (725)
 Saint Óengus the Culdee (Óengus of Tallaght, Angus), Bishop, of Clonenagh, Ireland (824)
 Hieromartyr Eulogius of Córdoba, Metropolitan of Cordoba, who suffered martyrdom for protecting St Leocritia, a young girl converted from Islam (859)
 Saint Firmian (Fermanus, Firminus), Abbot of San Sabino Piceno near Fermo in Italy (c. 1020)
 Saint Peter the Spaniard,  a pilgrim from Spain to Rome who settled as a hermit in Babuco near Veroli, confessor, renowned for miracles.

Post-Schism Orthodox saints

 Venerable Theodora of Arta, Queen of Arta, wife of Despot Michael II of Epirus (c. 1275)
 Saint Sophronius, recluse of the Kiev Caves (13th century)
 Saint Euthymius II of Novgorod, Archbishop of Novgorod, Wonderworker (1458)
 Saint Sophronius of Vratsa, Bishop of Vratsa, Bulgaria (1813)
 Venerable Alexis of Goloseyevsky Skete, Kiev Caves (1917)

New martyrs and confessors

 New Hiero-confessor Patrick (Petrov), hieromonk of Valaam Monastery (1933)
 New Hieromartyr Basil Malahov, Priest (1937)
 New Hiero-confessor Michael (Galushko), Schema-archimandrite, of Svyatogorsk Monastery (1961)

Other commemorations

 Translation to Constantinople of the relics of Martyr Epimachus of Pelusium, from Alexandria (250)
 Slaying of Emperor Paul I of Russia (1801)

Icon gallery

Notes

References

Sources
 March 11/March 24. Orthodox Calendar (PRAVOSLAVIE.RU).
 March 24 / March 11. HOLY TRINITY RUSSIAN ORTHODOX CHURCH (A parish of the Patriarchate of Moscow).
 March 11. OCA - The Lives of the Saints.
 The Autonomous Orthodox Metropolia of Western Europe and the Americas (ROCOR). St. Hilarion Calendar of Saints for the year of our Lord 2004. St. Hilarion Press (Austin, TX). p. 21.
 March 11. Latin Saints of the Orthodox Patriarchate of Rome.
 Rev. Richard Stanton. A Menology of England and Wales, or, Brief Memorials of the Ancient British and English Saints Arranged According to the Calendar, Together with the Martyrs of the 16th and 17th Centuries. London: Burns & Oates, 1892. pp. 110-111.
 The Roman Martyrology. Transl. by the Archbishop of Baltimore. Last Edition, According to the Copy Printed at Rome in 1914. Revised Edition, with the Imprimatur of His Eminence Cardinal Gibbons. Baltimore: John Murphy Company, 1916. pp. 72–73.
Greek Sources
 Great Synaxaristes:  11 ΜΑΡΤΙΟΥ. ΜΕΓΑΣ ΣΥΝΑΞΑΡΙΣΤΗΣ.
  Συναξαριστής. 11 Μαρτίου. ECCLESIA.GR. (H ΕΚΚΛΗΣΙΑ ΤΗΣ ΕΛΛΑΔΟΣ).
Russian Sources
  24 марта (11 марта). Православная Энциклопедия под редакцией Патриарха Московского и всея Руси Кирилла (электронная версия). (Orthodox Encyclopedia - Pravenc.ru).
  11 марта (ст.ст.) 24 марта 2013 (нов. ст.). Русская Православная Церковь Отдел внешних церковных связей. (DECR).

March in the Eastern Orthodox calendar